Cryptomenorrhea or cryptomenorrhoea, also known as hematocolpos, is a condition where menstruation occurs but is not visible due to an obstruction of the outflow tract. Specifically the endometrium is shed, but a congenital obstruction such as a vaginal septum or on part of the hymen retains the menstrual flow. A patient with cryptomenorrhea will appear to have amenorrhea but will experience cyclic menstrual pain.  The condition is surgically correctable.

The patient usually presents at the age of puberty when the commencement of menstruation blood gets collected in the vagina and gives rise to symptoms.

Symptoms
Eugonadotropic primary amenorrhea and cyclical lower abdominal pain are the chief presenting complaints of hematocolpos. Patient may be brought in emergency urinary retention.

Signs
 Abdominal examination: swelling is felt on palpation.
 On vulval inspection: a tense, bulging, bluish membrane is seen, this finding varies according to the thickness of the obstructing membrane. It may be absent in patients with complete or partial vaginal agenesis.
 On rectal examination: a large bulging mass is felt.

Complications
 hematometra (collection of blood in the uterine cavity)
 hematosalpinx (collection of blood in fallopian tubes)
 endometriosis in long-standing cases
 in severe, untreated forms, infertility and urinary retention

Diagnosis

Cryptomenorrhea can be easily diagnosed using ultrasound. The vagina is commonly seen filled with blood and the uterus usually appears pushed upward.

Treatment
A simple cruciate incision followed by excision of tags of hymen allows drainage of the retained menstrual blood. A thicker transverse vaginal septum can be treated with Z-plasty.  A blind vagina will require a partial or complete vaginoplasty.  Hematosalpinx may require laparotomy or laparoscopy for removal and reconstruction of affected tube.

Infertility may require assisted reproductive techniques.

References

External links 

Gynaecologic disorders